Chittarikkal  is a town in Kasaragod district in the state of Kerala, India.

Demographics
 India census, Chittarikkal had a population of 14278 with 7000 males and 7278 females.

References

Nileshwaram area